The 1987 BCE Canadian Professional Championship was a professional non-ranking snooker tournament, which took place between 2 and 8 August 1987 at the Scarborough Village Theatre in Toronto, Canada.

Cliff Thorburn won the title for the fourth year in a row, and fifth overall, by beating Jim Bear 8–4 in the final.

Main draw

References

Canadian Professional Championship
1987 in snooker
1987 in Canadian sports